Ventspils (see other names) is a state city in northwestern Latvia in the historical Courland region of Latvia, and is the sixth largest city in the country. 

At the beginning of 2020, Ventspils had a population of 33,906. It is situated on the Venta River and the Baltic Sea, and has an ice-free port. The city's name literally means "castle on the Venta", referring to the Livonian Order's castle built alongside the Venta River.

Other names
Ventspils was historically known as Windau in German.

A Russian name from the time of the Russian Empire was Виндава (Vindava) or Виндау (Vindau) although Вентспилс (Ventspils) has been used since World War II.

History 
Ventspils developed around the Livonian Order Ventspils Castle, built along the Venta River. It was chartered in 1314 and became an important mercantile city of the Hanseatic League.

As part of the Duchy of Courland, Ventspils blossomed as a shipbuilding centre. 44 warships and 79 trading ships were built in the town, and it was from Ventspils that the Duke's fleet set out to colonize Gambia and Tobago. Metal, amber, and wood-working shops also became important to the city's development.

During the Polish-Swedish War and the Great Northern War, Ventspils was destroyed, and in 1711 a plague wiped out most of the remaining inhabitants. After the Third Partition of Poland in 1795 Ventspils fell under the control of Russian Empire.

It was not until about 1850 that shipbuilding and trade became important again. The port was modernized in the 1890s and connected to Moscow by rail. It became one of Imperial Russia's most profitable ports, by 1913 turning a yearly profit of 130 million rubles. The population soared as well, growing from 7,000 in 1897, to 29,000 in 1913.

During the German occupation from 1915 to 1919, the population decreased almost by half, though some returned home during the First Republic of Latvia (1918–1940).

In 1939, the Red Army established a base in Ventspils. Under Soviet rule, an oil pipeline was built to Ventspils, and became the USSR's leading port in crude oil export.  north of Ventspils is the ex-Soviet radioastronomy installation VIRAC (Ventspils Starptautiskais radioastronomijas centrs or Ventspils International Radio Astronomy Centre). The existence of the Centrs was unknown to most Latvians until 1994. After independence, the Latvian government began a city-beautification process to make the city more attractive to tourists.

In 2004, Ventspils was a host city for a multi-national (United States, United Kingdom, Poland, Sweden, Russia, Latvia, Denmark, Finland, Norway) naval exercise called Baltic Operations XXXIII (BALTOPS). The force was led by the guided missile cruiser [[USS Anzio (CG-68)|USS Anzio]] and the destroyer . The US vessels were the first American warships to visit the port of Ventspils since Latvian independence was declared.

Climate
Ventspils is in the transition zone between an oceanic climate and a humid continental climate (Cfb and Dfb in the Köppen climate classification) with winters just below freezing point and warm summers. Latvian Environment, Geology and Meteorology Centre. Retrieved 4 August 2014. 

 Demography 
At the beginning of 2017, Ventspils had an official population of 39,447 (54.3% of them were women compared with 45.7% men).

63% of Ventspils population (24,762 people) are 15–62 years old, 14.3% (5,647 people) are 0–14 years old, and 22.6% (8,877 people) are 62 years and over.

Population of Ventspils according to ethnic group:

 Education 
Institutions of higher education and science include:
 Ventspils University College
 Riga Technical University, Ventspils branch
 Riga Teacher Training and Educational Management Academy, Ventspils branch
 College of Law, Ventspils branch

 Economy 

Ventspils is situated at the mouth of the Venta River, where it empties into the Baltic Sea, and is an important ice-free port. Large amounts of oil and other mineral resources from Russia are loaded aboard ships at Ventspils. Ventspils Airport, one of the three international airports in Latvia, is located in the city. Ventspils High Technology Park provides infrastructure and services to IT and electronics companies.

 Culture 

Every winter Ventspils hosts the awarding ceremony of the Latvian Radio broadcast Musical Bank and the televised national selection for the Eurovision Song Contest. On the second weekend of July the Sea Festival takes place, and on the first weekend of August there is an annual city festival. Festivals "Ghetto games and Vakara pastaiga are popular.

There are several institutions taking responsibility for the cultural life of Ventspils, including:
 The Theatre House "Juras varti" presents professional performing arts of various genres.
 The Ventspils Museum is engaged in the research and the recording of the history of Ventspils. It writes the Ventspils City Chronicle, builds up the collections of the museum and carries out scientific work.
 The Ventspils Library is a municipal, cultural, educational, and information institution.
 The International Writers and Translators' House is an international centre for writers and translators.

Sport 

Ventspils has a well developed sports infrastructure. One of the most popular sporting facility in Ventspils is the ''Olympic Centre 'Ventspils offering a basketball hall, ice hall, track-and-field arena, and football stadiums. One can also enjoy the Water Adventure Park,Seaside Aqua-Park, and Adventure Park that turns into a Skiing Hill 'Lemberga hūte during the winter.

The city has a basketball team that has won the Latvian championship in the last several years. In the 2001/2002 season, the team took third place in the North European Basketball League (NEBL). Ventspils also has a football team in FK Ventspils who compete in the Virsliga. In the 2006 season the team has won the Latvian championship for the first time.

 Adventure Park 
Ventspils has an Adventure Park (Latvian: Piedzīvojumu parks) that consists of Tube Sliding Track, Airsoft Shooting Range, Bumper boats, Trampoline Complex, Trampoline with Rubber Ribbons, Mad Rotor, Catapult, Trampoline boat, Playhouse for children, Inflatable Attractions in the summer.

In the winter you can skiing, snowboarding and sledding.

There is also a rodeo track (Latvian: Rodeļu trase) in construction, it will be available to use in 2023 summer.

Ventspils has a  narrow gauge train; a beach and dunes and an observatory with a telescope and digital planetarium.

Old Town of Ventspils

Ventspils developed rapidly as a commercial harbour in the years of growth of Duchy of Courland and Semigallia. The most active building works took place in the vicinity of the present Market Square where a number of former storehouses from the 17th century are preserved. A dwelling house at the crossing of Tirgus and Skolas Streets is one of the oldest houses of such type in Latvia (built in 1646).

Next to the Market Square, in a historical school building on Skolas street, there is the Ventspils House of the Crafts (2007). The International Writers’ and Translators’ House (2006) was opened on the premises of the former City Hall (1850), on the City-Hall Square. The building is reconstructed to accommodate creative work and everyday needs of its writers. Located next to it are the recently renovated Ventspils Central Library (2006) and Evangelic-Lutheran Church of Nicholas (1835). The City-Hall Square, the Market Square and the Ostas Street Promenade are popular walking places.

Cow sculptures

CowParade in Ventspils took place in 2002, and now several cow sculptures''' reside in the city:

 ‘Latvijas melnā’ (Latvian Black Cow) dwells on the Promenade of Ostas iela;
 ‘Pretim gaismai’ (Towards the Light) that usually climbs the lamp post on Pils iela next to ‘Latvenergo’ JSC;
 ‘Ms. Moo-Dunk’ the basketball cow resides near the Basketball Hall of the Olympic Centre ‘Ventspils’;
 ‘Dzīve ir skaista’ (Life is Beautiful) is situated at the Children's Park ‘Bērnu pilsētiņa’ (Children's Town);
 ‘Jūras govs’ (Cow of the Sea) dwells next to the Livonian Order Castle facing the River Venta;
 ‘Nafta’ (Oil) lives next to the Children's Home ‘Selga’;
 ‘Londonas govs’ (London Cow) welcomes the residents of the camping site ‘Piejūras kempings’.
There are also three considerably larger cows:
 ‘Ceļojošā govs’ (Travelling Cow) is shaped like a huge suitcase and awaits the city guests on the Promenade of Ostas iela to take some pictures;
 ‘Govs-Matrozis’ (The Sailor Cow) is a giant blue-coloured cow dressed as a seafarer and situated at the Southern Pier of Ventspils;
 ‘Šūpojošā govs’ (Cow on the Swings) is a large, but cute and girly cow sitting on the swings not far from the excursion boat ‘Hercogs Jēkabs’.

Notable people 
Fred Rebell (1886–1968) – single-handed sailor
Dorothy Dworkin (1889-1976) – nurse, businesswoman, and philanthropist.
Fricis Kaņeps (1916–1981) – footballer
Francis Rudolph (1921–2005) – painter
Imant Raminsh (1943) – composer
Dzintars Ābiķis (1952) – politician
Ģirts Valdis Kristovskis (1962) – politician
Sandis Prūsis (1965) – bobsleigh pilot
Gundars Vētra (1967) – basketball star
Oleg Belozyorov (1969) - Russian politician and manager; serving as president of Russian Railways since August 20, 2015.
Ēriks Rags (1975) – javelin thrower
Gatis Gūts (1976) – bobsleigh pilot
Ingus Janevics (1986) – speedwalker
Rebeka Koha (1998) – Olympic weightlifter

Twin towns – sister cities

Ventspils is twinned with:
 Lorient, France
 Ningbo, China
 Novopolotsk, Belarus
 Polotsk, Belarus
 Stralsund, Germany
 Västervik, Sweden

Significant depictions in popular culture
 Windau (Ventspils) is one of the starting towns of the State of the Teutonic Order in the turn-based strategy game Medieval II: Total War: Kingdoms.
 Windau can be established in trading simulation game Patrician III as an Alderman Task

See also 
 Ventspils Castle
 Ports of the Baltic Sea
 List of cities in Latvia

References

External links 

 City's Official Website

 
Cities in Latvia
Republican cities of Latvia
Port cities in Latvia
Port cities and towns of the Baltic Sea
Populated coastal places in Latvia
Windau County